"I Believe" is a song written by Skip Ewing and Donny Kees, and recorded by American country music band Diamond Rio.  It was released in November 2002 as the second single from their album Completely.  The song became Diamond Rio's fifth and final No. 1 single on the Billboard Country Songs chart in 2003.

Music video
The song's music video takes place in an area where many bad incidents are happening and a man is coping with losing his wife by finding comfort in angels. But at the end, she awakens. It was directed by Deaton Flanigen and premiered on January 8, 2003 on CMT.

Chart performance
This song debuted at No. 58 on the Billboard Country Songs chart dated November 23, 2002. The song climbed to No. 1 on the chart dated May 31, 2003, where it held for 2 weeks, marking the group's fifth and final No. 1 single. The song also peaked at No. 31 on the Billboard Hot 100.

Year-end charts

References

2002 songs
Diamond Rio songs
Songs written by Skip Ewing
Songs written by Donny Kees
2002 singles
Arista Nashville singles
2000s ballads
Country ballads
Music videos directed by Deaton-Flanigen Productions